Thomas John George Gilmore (born 8 May 1946) is an Australian politician.

Early life 
Gilmore was born in Mareeba. His father, Tom Gilmore Sr., had been a federal and state Country Party politician.

Politics 
Gilmore served on Mareeba Shire Council from 1982 to 1987. In 1986 he was elected as the National Party member for Tablelands in the Queensland Legislative Assembly. In 1992 he moved to the front bench as Shadow Minister for Minerals and Energy, a portfolio he held until the Coalition took government in 1996, whereupon he became the Minister. He was defeated in 1998 by One Nation candidate, Shaun Nelson.

In 2000 he was elected to the Mareeba Shire Council. 

From 2008 to 20013, Shire of Mareeba was absorbed into the Tablelands Region. During this period Gilmore was mayor of Tablelands Region from 2008 to 2012. After the deamalgamation of the Shire of Mareeba in 2014, he was elected Mayor of Mareeba and then re-elected in 2016.

In October 2019 he announced his retirement as Mayor of Mareeba at the 2020 local government elections.

Legacy 
Gilmore was awarded the Medal of the Order of Australia on 8 June 2020 for services to the Parliament and people of Queensland.

References

1946 births
Living people
National Party of Australia members of the Parliament of Queensland
Members of the Queensland Legislative Assembly
Queensland local councillors